Michael Fitzgibbon (9 September 1898 - December 1975) was an Irish hurler. His career included success at club level with Young Irelands, at inter-county level with Limerick and at inter-provincial level with Munster.

Honours

Young Irelands
Limerick Senior Hurling Championship (5): 1920, 1922, 1928, 1930, 1932

Limerick
Munster Senior Hurling Championship (2): 1923, 1933 (c)

Munster
Railway Cup (4): 1928, 1929, 1930, 1931

References

1898 births
1975 deaths
Young Irelands (Limerick) hurlers
Limerick inter-county hurlers
Munster inter-provincial hurlers